Kenneth Hudson Campbell (born June 5, 1962) is an American Film, television and voice actor.

Early life
Campbell attended York Community High School in Elmhurst, Illinois, Southern Illinois University Carbondale and Columbia College Chicago. He began training in improvisation at the Players Worksop of The Second City in 1983. He then performed with the comedy group Contents Under Pressure before joining The Second City, performing with its National Touring Company. He then became a member of the Resident Company of the Northwest and E.T.C. companies, before moving to Hollywood.

Career
When a member of The Second City, Campbell played Santa  in Home Alone. He then played "Animal" or "Lust" for three years on the Fox television series Herman's Head. He was Buckman in the FOX 1996 submarine comedy  Down Periscope. Campbell appeared in the Seinfeld episode "The Seven", where he played Ken, the husband of Susan's first cousin, Carrie. He played "Bruce", the owner of a bookstore in the 1997 Disney Channel Original Movie Under Wraps. He appeared as oil driller Max Lennert in the film Armageddon, and as the "Man in Hall" in Groundhog Day. Campbell was the voice of Baby Bob in the CBS television series Baby Bob and commercial campaigns for Free Internet.com and Quiznos.

Campbell was the voice of the beaver Gordon along with the late Norm Macdonald in Canadian Bell Mobility phone commercials and served for a decade as the primary imaging voice for Cleveland adult hits station WHLK "106.5 The Lake." He is presently the primary voice heard on KYOT 95.5 "The Mountain" radio in Phoenix, Arizona.

He voiced the bear, Boomer, in the animated film Wonder Park (2019) and the consequent animated series on Nickelodeon.

Filmography

Film

Television

References

External links

1962 births
Living people
20th-century American male actors
21st-century American male actors
American male television actors
American male voice actors
American people of Scottish descent
People from Elmhurst, Illinois